Adrián Johnny Jusino Cerruto (born 9 July 1992) is an American born Bolivian professional footballer who plays as a defender for Bolivian club The Strongest and the Bolivia national team.

With Bolivia he has earned 24 caps and has played at 1 Copa America.

Club career
Jusino played a year of college soccer at Richland College in 2013, before playing for Unión Maestranza and Always Ready in Bolivia, as well as a short spell with Premier Development League side Ventura County Fusion in 2016. He returned to the United States on 23 January 2018 when he signed with United Soccer League side Tulsa Roughnecks.

International career
Jusino made his debut for Bolivia national football team on 3 March 2019 in a friendly against Nicaragua.

References

External links
 
 
 
 
 

1992 births
Living people
American people of Bolivian descent
People with acquired Bolivian citizenship
Sportspeople from Springfield, Massachusetts
Soccer players from Massachusetts
American soccer players
Bolivian footballers
Association football defenders
Richland College Thunderducks men's soccer players
Ventura County Fusion players
FC Tulsa players
Club Always Ready players
Club Bolívar players
USL League Two players
USL Championship players
Bolivian Primera División players
Bolivia international footballers
2019 Copa América players
2021 Copa América players